In mathematical finite group theory, the Thompson subgroup  of a finite p-group P refers to one of several characteristic subgroups of P.  originally defined  to be the subgroup generated by the abelian subgroups of P of maximal rank. More often the Thompson subgroup     is defined to be the subgroup generated by the abelian subgroups of P of maximal order or the subgroup generated by the elementary abelian subgroups of P of maximal rank.

See also

Glauberman normal p-complement theorem
ZJ theorem
Puig subgroup, a subgroup analogous to the Thompson subgroup

References

Finite groups